Tradeston is a small district in the Scottish city of Glasgow adjacent to the city centre on the south bank of the River Clyde.

Geography
The M74 Extension traverses the area.

The Tradeston Bridge, opened on 14 May 2009, links Tradeston and neighbouring Kingston with Broomielaw and the city's International Financial Services District.

Economy
Many former industrial buildings in the area were demolished as part of the M74 Extension which opened in June 2011. Barclays Bank opened a new headquarters at the Tradeston waterfront on the River Clyde's south bank in 2021, expected to lead to thousands of new jobs and kickstart the regeneration of Tradeston as a whole. Known as Buchanan Wharf and managed by Stallan-Brand architects, the project consisted of replacing low rise industrial units with new office buildings and renovating two previously derelict listed 1870s warehouses, the BECO Building and Kingston House, for public use.

Transport
Tradeston is served by the Glasgow Subway system at West Street and Bridge Street stations.

West Street station is the proposed location of a major new rail-subway interchange as part of the Crossrail Glasgow proposal.

 
The area was the scene of a tragedy in 1994 when a double-decker bus carrying a group of Girl Guides from the city's Drumchapel district crashed into one of the low rail bridges crossing West Street immediately adjacent to the subway station (the driver was unfamiliar with the route and was being led by a guide leader in a car); two 10-year-old girls, an 11-year-old girl and two adult supervisors were killed in the incident and 15 other children injured, six of them seriously. A similar incident occurred at another nearby low bridge on Cook Street in 2009, although on that occasion the bus was empty and returning to the depot.

Industry 
Tradeston was the site of another tragedy in 1872 when the Tradeston Flour Mills exploded killing 18 people who worked at the mills and people who worked or lived in surrounding buildings, and starting a fire that threatened Bridge Street railway station and ships docked on the River Clyde.

References

Gorbals
Business parks of Scotland
Areas of Glasgow
Industrial parks in the United Kingdom
Industry in Scotland
Economy of Glasgow